Gonioclymenia is a genus of Devonian ammonites.

References

Clymeniida
Devonian animals
Ammonite genera